Minister for Auckland is a ministerial portfolio in the government of New Zealand with responsibility over issues concerning Auckland, first created by Prime Minister Helen Clark in 1999 and reinstated by Chris Hipkins in 2023. The first minister was Judith Tizard, and the current minister is Michael Wood.

History

Resident Minister for Auckland 
After Wellington became capital of New Zealand in 1865, with the seat of government moving from Auckland to the new capital, some of the government ministries appointed an agent at Auckland. This was sometimes referred to as "Resident Minister for Auckland" in the contemporary media. This was not a ministerial appointment, but instead a paid role for the government. Daniel Pollen held the role twice (1868–1869 and 1870–1873) and on both occasions, he resigned from the Legislative Council so that he could take on this role. Confusingly, the 1869–1872 Fox Ministry appointed William Reeves as Resident Minister for Middle Island (December 1871 – September 1872) and unlike the Auckland role, that was a ministerial appointment.

Fifth Labour Government 
Under Prime Minister Helen Clark, Judith Tizard first held the portfolio as "Minister assisting the Prime Minister on Auckland issues" from December 1999 until August 2002 until it was changed to "Minister for Auckland Issues", which she held from August 2002 until October 2007.

List of ministers 

 Key

References

Lists of government ministers of New Zealand
Politics of New Zealand